Cassida malaysiana is a species of leaf beetle, situated in the subfamily Cassidinae (tortoise beetles) and the genus Cassida. It was described as a new species in 2010 from specimens collected in Malaysia in 2005.

Description
Cassida malaysiana measures 4.8–5.4 mm in length. It has a yellow pronotum with a large black spot at the base and on the disc. The elytra are black with pale yellow/orange spots throughout. Males are slightly smaller and stouter than females.

References

Cassidinae
Beetles of Asia
Beetles described in 2010